Clooney may refer to:

People
Clooney (surname)

Places
Clooney, Bunratty Upper, a civil parish and townland in the Barony of Bunratty Upper, County Clare, Ireland
Clooney, Corcomroe, a civil parish and townland in the Barony of Corcomroe, County Clare, Ireland
Clooney, Kilcronaghan civil parish, a townland in County Londonderry, Northern Ireland

See also 
Cluny (disambiguation)